Nashville, Chattanooga and St. Louis 576 is a 4-8-4 "Dixie" (Northern) type steam locomotive built in August 1942 by the American Locomotive Company (ALCO) of Schenectady, New York, for the Nashville, Chattanooga and St. Louis Railway (NC&StL) as a member of the J3 class. Designed with some of the latest locomotive technological features of the time, the J3s were used to haul heavy freight and troop trains to aid the American war effort during World War II.

Faced with dwindling traffic and the onset of dieselization, all of the J3s were retired from revenue service and scrapped by September 2, 1952, with the exception of No. 576, which was donated to the City of Nashville, Tennessee, and put on display at the Centennial Park as the sole surviving steam locomotive of the NC&StL Railway. 

The No. 576 locomotive is currently being restored to operating condition by the Nashville Steam Preservation Society (NSPS) for use in excursion service on the shortline Nashville and Eastern Railroad. The restoration work was expected to be completed by 2024.

History

Design and appearance
During the outbreak of World War II, the Nashville, Chattanooga and St. Louis Railway (NC&StL) were unable to order more diesel locomotives for the increased passenger train traffic. They decided to go for steam power with the American Locomotive Company (ALCO) proposing a streamlined 4-8-4 J3 locomotive similar to the Norfolk and Western J class locomotives, but was rejected by the Louisville and Nashville Railroad (L&N) due to the expensive design cost. 

The NC&StL locomotive crews nicknamed the J3s as the Yellow Jackets due to their yellow skirting design. In 1943, ALCO built ten more J3s (Nos. 580-589) without the yellow skirting panels due to wartime restrictions so their running board edges were painted yellow, giving them the nickname Stripes. The same treatment was given to the 1942 J3 locomotives when their yellow skirting panels were removed in 1947 for easier maintenance and even the bullet nose cones were removed on all of the J3s. As opposed to the 4-8-4s nicknamed the Northerns, the J3s were nicknamed the Dixies.

Revenue service and retirement
No. 576 was built at a cost of $166,500 and delivered to the NC&StL Railway, where it entered revenue service on August 18, 1942. No. 576 and the other J3s handled the critical war-time material, armament and troop train movements during the rapid buildup and mobilization of the American war effort during World War II. They were only assigned to run between Nashville and Chattanooga, Tennessee, due to the turntable limitations in Atlanta, Georgia, until the 110-feet turntables were eventually installed for the J3s to be turned around in Atlanta. When the war ended in 1945, the J3s were reassigned to dual freight and passenger service.

As the NC&StL began to dieselize, all of the J3s were retired and scrapped between 1951 and 1952, excluding No. 576, which was chosen for preservation and was subsequently donated to the City of Nashville, where it was put on display at the Centennial Park on September 30, 1953. There were originally plans restore to No. 576 to operating condition in 2001, but the Nashville Board of Parks and Recreation at the time declined it. In 2004, a shelter shed was built over the No. 576 locomotive to protect it from the elements.

Restoration
In April 2016, the newly formed Nashville Steam Preservation Society (NSPS) proposed plans of restoring No. 576 to operating condition and run it on the shortline Nashville and Eastern Railroad (NERR), pulling the Tennessee Central Railway Museum's (TCRM) excursions. In June 2016, the Nashville Board of Parks and Recreation approved idea of the NSPS leasing No. 576. In April 2017, the NSPS volunteers inspected that No. 576's boiler was in good condition. In October 2018, the NSPS had successfully raised $500,000 to relocate and transport No. 576 out of the park and into the TCRM's restoration facility. 

On January 13, 2019, the No. 576 locomotive was moved out of the Centennial Park via flatbed truck and placed on the Nashville and Western rails on February 6, where it was prepared to be moved to CSX trackage. The No. 576 locomotive made its final public appearance at the former Nashville Union Station on March 9, 2019, and the next day, moved to the TCRM's workshop where the restoration work on No. 576 begin. The restoration cost was estimated at $2.5 million. During the restoration work, a new cab was fabricated from scratch since the locomotive's original cab was discovered to be in deteriorated condition. In June 2019, the NSPS received two boxcars from CSX Transportation to store the restoration equipment and materials needed throughout the locomotive restoration progress.

On March 25, 2021, a violent storm damaged the TCRM's workshop facility where No. 576 was stored. The locomotive was undamaged with the workshop rebuilt shortly after and the restoration work has resumed. On April 15, Trains Magazine donated $600,000 to the NSPS for the renovation of No. 576's driving wheels and trucks while the boiler has to be hydrostatically tested. On June 17, 2021, No. 576's boiler and frame have been lifted up from its wheels and running gear for them to be repaired. The driving wheels were sent to be repaired at the Tennessee Valley Railroad Museum in Chattanooga, Tennessee. The restoration work of No. 576 is expected to be completed around 2024.

Gallery

See also
Chesapeake and Ohio 614
Grand Trunk Western 6325
Norfolk and Western 611
Reading 2101
Reading 2102
Santa Fe 3751
Southern Pacific 4449
Spokane, Portland and Seattle 700
Union Pacific 844

References

Bibliography

Further reading

External links

Nashville Steam Preservation Society

4-8-4 locomotives
ALCO locomotives
Railway locomotives introduced in 1942
Standard gauge locomotives of the United States
Steam locomotives of the United States
Individual locomotives of the United States
Preserved steam locomotives of Tennessee